Kevin Cyril Hamilton  (born 12 April 1938) was an Australian politician who represented the South Australian House of Assembly seat of Albert Park from 1979 to 1993 for the Labor Party.

References

Members of the South Australian House of Assembly
1938 births
Living people
Recipients of the Medal of the Order of Australia
Australian Labor Party members of the Parliament of South Australia